Kal Ab Ti (also Romanized as Kal Āb Tī) is a village in Tang-e Haft Rural District, Papi District, Khorramabad County, Lorestan Province, Iran. At the 2006 census, its population was 23, in 6 families.

References 

Towns and villages in Khorramabad County